Yannis Maroudas is a Greek author, screenwriter and lecturer at the School of Film Studies, Aristotle University of Thessaloniki Greece.
He has studied History, Cinematography, Cultural Management (MA) and is currently researching audiovisual culture, New media and film history. 
He has been steadily working as professional scriptwriter for television and cinema since 1989. In 2008, he won the National Award for Best Screenwriting in the movie Sklavoi Sta Desma Tous (Slaves To Fate).
Also, he has been a member of the Board of the Scriptwriters' Guild of Greece since 2007.

TV works
(as a scriptwriter)

 Parakamptirios (Detour), dramatic serial, 26 episodes, director: P. Michail, ET1 channel, 1991
 
 Xoris Makiyaz (Without Make-Up), dramatic teleplay, director: D. Mayroeidis, ANT1 channel, 1993
 
 Tolmires Istories (Spicy Stories), erotic TV series, 4 episodes, directors: D. Arvanitis, Th. Antoniou, ANT1, 1994-‘95
 
 Magiki Nichta (Night of Magic), mystery TV series, 2 episodes, director: D. Arvanitis, ET1 channel, 1995
 
 Vodka Portokali (Screw Driver), weekly TV sitcom, 33 episodes, director: V. Thomopoulos, ANT1, 2001-‘02
 
 Mexri Tris Einai Desmos, Eight (8) teleplays (comedies), 60΄ duration, ALTER channel, directors: Th. Antoniou, B. Spanos, 2004-‘05
 
 Safe Sex, weekly TV teleplays, 7 episodes, directors: K. Athanasiou, P. Fafoutis, MEGA channel, 2007

Film screenwriting
 O Elkystis (The Attractor), short film, director: M. Galanakis, production: G.F.C., Aigokeros SA, 1997 
 
 H Ptosi (The Fall), short film, director: M. Galanakis, production: ET1 channel, Aigokeros SA, 1999 
 
 Sklavoi Sta Desma Tous (Slaves to Fate), feature film, screen adaptation form the homonymous K. Theotokis’ novel, director: T. Lykouressis, production: G.F.C., 2008
 
 Dying for the Truth, (as a script adaptor), director: Nikos Megrelis, production: Οdeon & Faliro House Productions, CL Productions, Film In Mind Productions, co-production: Ε.Κ.Κ., Ε.Ρ.Τ, Neo Minima, 2011

Theatrical Plays
 Fones Paidion (Children's Voices), 1996 (2nd national prize for young writer)

Books
 Scribola, short stories, Oxy publ., 1999 
 
 I Mystiki Diathiki Tis Pinelopis Gavoyanni (The Secret Will of Penelope Gavoyannis), novel, Oceanida publ., 2008

Notes and references

External links
IMDB, https://www.imdb.com/name/nm1228203/

SGG, http://senariografoi.gr/

Academic staff of the Aristotle University of Thessaloniki
Greek writers
Living people
Year of birth missing (living people)